The Aotea Utanganui – Museum of South Taranaki, formerly known as the South Taranaki District Museum, is located Patea, South Taranaki, New Zealand.  The museum is a noteworthy archive of district information, articles and items, offering a rich and varied history of the area. The museum is located on State Highway 3 through Patea. The central section of the museum is the oldest colonial building in South Taranaki. The museum underwent renovations from 2008 to 2011.

History
It was built in 1869 and housed Taplin and Muir's General Store at the time of the first government sale of town sections in 1870.

The origins of the museum can be found within the Patea Historical Society. Its inaugural chair, G Livingston Baker QSM, was instrumental in the establishment of a local repository for the history of the former Patea Borough and County Council's, and the families who had settled in the area.

The collection of the museum includes paintings such as Hay-Campbell and Haddon's Arrival of Turi, commissioned in 1933 to commemorate the arrival of the eponymous ancestor of Ngati Ruanui and Nga Rauru, Turi in the 14th century. Other material relating to the Pātea Māori Club can also be found in the collection.

Organisation
From 2001 South Taranaki District Council provided an annual operating grant to the South Taranaki District Museum Trust. Through the adoption of the South Taranaki District Council's Arts, Culture and Heritage Policy, the Museum Trust and Council entered into a formal partnership which provided the shared objective of providing heritage services across the wider South Taranaki District.

The Trust cares for the collection, on behalf of the wider community of South Taranaki District, and is responsible for the governance. The Council provides the professional staff for the museum.

The museum closed its doors on 13 September 2008 to undergo a million dollar redevelopment, reopening on 30 April 2011. Architectural firm BSM Group Architects Ltd from Wanganui were commissioned to design the complex. Artifacts & great history have been conserved in the design while continuing the story of local iwi. The building was blessed later that year. The museum will have a new roof, larger archive, a public research and reading room, education space, new exhibition spaces and exhibitions, and upgraded collection stores.

In mid-2010 the museum was awarded a Bronze award as part of the Master Builders House Of The Year Awards. The Contractor was DML Builders Ltd from Wanganui.

Museum Staff 
 Cath Sheard, Tumuaki/Library and Cultural Services Manager
Cath is passionate about the local community and sees the museum as presenting incredible opportunities to build relationships with people.
 Luana Paamu, Kaitiaki Taonga/Collections Assistant 
Luana is responsible for the care of the taonga housed within the museum. Luana has strong ties in the local community and is deeply committed to the care and preservation of the objects housed within the museum, and to telling local stories.  
 Bronwyn Wattrus, Kaiwhakahaere o te Aroaro o te Whare/Front of House Administration
Bronwyn provides a friendly welcome to visitors to the museum as well as offering an efficient research service for the many and varied inquiries the museum receives.  In addition, Bronwyn provides much needed administrative support to the museum team.

Board 
 Rosanne Oakes (Chairperson)
 Marie Mackay (Secretary)
 Michelle Dwyer (Treasurer)
 Dave Crompton
 Narlene Ioane
 Barrie Marsh
 Andrew Ritson
 Gloria Tui

Volunteers 
 Barrie Marsh (2007 - current)

Past Directors/Managers/Supervisors 
 Paul Hewson, Director 
 Bridget Woodward, Director
 Raewyn Kahu-Ngarimu, Director
 Warwick Fry, Director
 Wayne P Marriott, Manager Arts, Culture & Heritage
 Libby Sharpe, Manager Arts, Culture & Heritage
 Lynne Walker, Manager Libraries, Arts, Culture & Heritage

References

External links 
 Museum information

Museums in Taranaki
Local museums in New Zealand
Commercial buildings completed in 1869
South Taranaki District
1869 establishments in New Zealand
1860s architecture in New Zealand
Patea